Patrick Agnew (born 8 March 1955) is a former Provisional Irish Republican Army (IRA) volunteer who was elected to Dáil Éireann during the 1981 Irish hunger strike.

Agnew was born in Dundalk, County Louth, Ireland in 1955. His grandfather was also an Irish republican and was an internee during the Irish War of Independence.

While his grandfather's activism factored into his decision to join the PIRA in 1972, Bloody Sunday was another influence. Catholics leaving or forced from their homes in Northern Ireland to stay in the local Clan na Gael Hall near his family home also made an impression on him. But, as he put it, “Republicanism was just in me.” He was imprisoned at Portlaoise, Mountjoy, Crumlin Road, and the H-Blocks of Long Kesh. He was involved in the blanket protest in the H-Blocks.
party.

Although not on hunger strike, he was elected as a Teachta Dála (TD) for the Louth constituency at the 1981 general election, topping the poll. He did not take his seat. The other successful Anti H-Block candidate was Kieran Doherty, who was elected in Cavan–Monaghan and died on hunger strike.

Agnew was released from prison in 1986 and joined the Gerard Halpenny Sinn Féin cumann in Dundalk, where he remains an active member of the party.

See also
List of members of the Oireachtas imprisoned since 1923

References

1955 births
Anti H-Block TDs
Irish republicans
Living people
Members of the 22nd Dáil
People from Dundalk
Provisional Irish Republican Army members
Republicans imprisoned during the Northern Ireland conflict
Sinn Féin politicians